The Burnside problem asks whether a finitely generated group in which every element has finite order must necessarily be a finite group. It was posed by William Burnside in 1902, making it one of the oldest questions in group theory and was influential in the development of combinatorial group theory. It is known to have a negative answer in general, as Evgeny Golod and Igor Shafarevich provided a counter-example in 1964. The problem has many refinements and variants (see bounded and restricted below) that differ in the additional conditions imposed on the orders of the group elements, some of which are still open questions.

Brief history 

Initial work pointed towards the affirmative answer. For example, if a group G is finitely generated and the order of each element of G is a divisor of 4, then G is finite. Moreover, A. I. Kostrikin was able to prove in 1958 that among the finite groups with a given number of generators and a given prime exponent, there exists a largest one. This provides a solution for the restricted Burnside problem for the case of prime exponent. (Later, in 1989, Efim Zelmanov was able to solve the restricted Burnside problem for an arbitrary exponent.) Issai Schur had shown in 1911 that any finitely generated periodic group that was a subgroup of the group of invertible n × n complex matrices was finite; he used this theorem to prove the Jordan–Schur theorem.

Nevertheless, the general answer to the Burnside problem turned out to be negative. In 1964, Golod and Shafarevich constructed an infinite group of Burnside type without assuming that all elements have uniformly bounded order. In 1968, Pyotr Novikov and Sergei Adian supplied a negative solution to the bounded exponent problem for all odd exponents larger than 4381. In 1982, A. Yu. Ol'shanskii found some striking counterexamples for sufficiently large odd exponents (greater than 1010), and supplied a considerably simpler proof based on geometric ideas.

The case of even exponents turned out to be much harder to settle. In 1992, S. V. Ivanov announced the negative solution for sufficiently large even exponents divisible by a large power of 2 (detailed proofs were published in 1994 and occupied some 300 pages). Later joint work of Ol'shanskii and Ivanov established a negative solution to an analogue of Burnside problem for hyperbolic groups, provided the exponent is sufficiently large. By contrast, when the exponent is small and different from 2, 3, 4 and 6, very little is known.

General Burnside problem 
A group G is called periodic if every element has finite order; in other words, for each g in G, there exists some positive integer n such that gn = 1. Clearly, every finite group is periodic. There exist easily defined groups such as the p∞-group which are infinite periodic groups; but the latter group cannot be finitely generated.

General Burnside problem. If G is a finitely generated, periodic group, then is G necessarily finite?

This question was answered in the negative in 1964 by Evgeny Golod and Igor Shafarevich, who gave an example of an infinite p-group that is finitely generated (see Golod–Shafarevich theorem). However, the orders of the elements of this group are not a priori bounded by a single constant.

Bounded Burnside problem 

Part of the difficulty with the general Burnside problem is that the requirements of being finitely generated and periodic give very little information about the possible structure of a group. Therefore, we pose more requirements on G. Consider a periodic group G with the additional property that there exists a least integer n such that for all g in G, gn = 1. A group with this property is said to be periodic with bounded exponent n, or just a group with exponent n. Burnside problem for groups with bounded exponent asks:

Burnside problem I. If G is a finitely generated group with exponent n, is G necessarily finite?

It turns out that this problem can be restated as a question about the finiteness of groups in a particular family. The free Burnside group of rank m and exponent n, denoted B(m, n), is a group with m distinguished generators x1, ..., xm in which the identity xn = 1 holds for all elements x, and which is the "largest" group satisfying these requirements. More precisely, the characteristic property of B(m, n) is that, given any group G with m generators g1, ..., gm and of exponent n, there is a unique homomorphism from B(m, n) to G that maps the ith generator xi of B(m, n) into the ith generator gi of  G. In the language of group presentations, free Burnside group B(m, n) has m generators x1, ..., xm and the relations xn = 1 for each word x in x1, ..., xm, and any group G with m generators of exponent n is obtained from it by imposing additional relations. The existence of the free Burnside group and its uniqueness up to an isomorphism are established by standard techniques of group theory. Thus if G is any finitely generated group of exponent n, then G is a homomorphic image of B(m, n), where m is the number of generators of G. Burnside problem can now be restated as follows:

Burnside problem II. For which positive integers m, n is the free Burnside group B(m, n) finite?

The full solution to Burnside problem in this form is not known. Burnside considered some easy cases in his original paper:

B(1, n) is the cyclic group of order n.
B(m, 2) is the direct product of m copies of the cyclic group of order 2 and hence finite.

The following additional results are known (Burnside, Sanov, M. Hall):

B(m, 3), B(m, 4), and B(m, 6) are finite for all m.

The particular case of B(2, 5) remains open:  it was not known whether this group is finite.

The breakthrough in solving the Burnside problem was achieved by Pyotr Novikov and Sergei Adian in 1968. Using a complicated combinatorial argument, they demonstrated that for every odd number n with n > 4381, there exist infinite, finitely generated groups of exponent n. Adian later improved the bound on the odd exponent to 665. The latest improvement to the bound on odd exponent is 101 obtained by Adian himself in 2015. The case of even exponent turned out to be considerably more difficult. It was only in 1994 that Sergei Vasilievich Ivanov was able to prove an analogue of Novikov–Adian theorem: for any m > 1 and an even n ≥ 248, n divisible by 29, the group B(m, n) is infinite; together with the Novikov–Adian theorem, this implies infiniteness for all m > 1 and n ≥ 248. This was improved in 1996 by I. G. Lysënok to m > 1 and n ≥ 8000. Novikov–Adian, Ivanov and Lysënok established considerably more precise results on the structure of the free Burnside groups. In the case of the odd exponent, all finite subgroups of the free Burnside groups were shown to be cyclic groups. In the even exponent case, each finite subgroup is contained in a product of two dihedral groups, and there exist non-cyclic finite subgroups. Moreover, the word and conjugacy problems were shown to be effectively solvable in B(m, n) both for the cases of odd and even exponents n.

A famous class of counterexamples to the Burnside problem is formed by finitely generated non-cyclic infinite groups in which every nontrivial proper subgroup is a finite cyclic group, the so-called Tarski Monsters. First examples of such groups were constructed by A. Yu. Ol'shanskii in 1979 using geometric methods, thus affirmatively solving O. Yu. Schmidt's problem. In 1982 Ol'shanskii was able to strengthen his results to establish existence, for any sufficiently large prime number p (one can take p > 1075) of a finitely generated infinite group in which every nontrivial proper subgroup is a cyclic group of order p. In a paper published in 1996, Ivanov and Ol'shanskii solved an analogue of the Burnside problem in an arbitrary hyperbolic group for sufficiently large exponents.

Restricted Burnside problem 
Formulated in the 1930s, it asks another, related, question:

Restricted Burnside problem. If it is known that a group G with m generators and exponent n is finite, can one conclude that the order of G is bounded by some constant depending only on m and n? Equivalently, are there only finitely many finite groups with m generators of exponent n, up to isomorphism?

This variant of the Burnside problem can also be stated in terms of certain universal groups with m generators and exponent n. By basic results of group theory, the intersection of two subgroups of finite index in any group is itself a subgroup of finite index. Let M be the intersection of all subgroups of the free Burnside group B(m, n) which have finite index, then M is a normal subgroup of B(m, n) (otherwise, there exists a subgroup g−1Mg with finite index containing elements not in M). One can therefore define a group B0(m, n) to be the factor group B(m, n)/M. Every finite group of exponent n with m generators is a homomorphic image of B0(m, n).
The restricted Burnside problem then asks whether B0(m, n) is a finite group.

In the case of the prime exponent p, this problem was extensively studied by A. I. Kostrikin during the 1950s, prior to the negative solution of the general Burnside problem. His solution, establishing the finiteness of B0(m, p), used a relation with deep questions about identities in Lie algebras in finite characteristic. The case of arbitrary exponent has been completely settled in the affirmative by Efim Zelmanov, who was awarded the Fields Medal in 1994 for his work.

Notes

References

Bibliography 
 S. I. Adian (1979) The Burnside problem and identities in groups. Translated from the Russian by John Lennox and James Wiegold. Ergebnisse der Mathematik und ihrer Grenzgebiete [Results in Mathematics and Related Areas], 95. Springer-Verlag, Berlin-New York. .
  Translation in 
 
 
 A. I. Kostrikin (1990) Around Burnside. Translated from the Russian and with a preface by James Wiegold. Ergebnisse der Mathematik und ihrer Grenzgebiete (3) [Results in Mathematics and Related Areas (3)], 20. Springer-Verlag, Berlin. .
  Translation in 
 A. Yu. Ol'shanskii (1989) Geometry of defining relations in groups. Translated from the 1989 Russian original by Yu. A. Bakhturin (1991) Mathematics and its Applications (Soviet Series), 70. Dordrecht: Kluwer Academic Publishers Group. .
  Translation in 
  Translation in

External links 
 History of the Burnside problem at MacTutor History of Mathematics archive

Group theory
Unsolved problems in mathematics